Vecchio (plural vecchi, meaning "old one" or simply "old"), is a category of aged, male characters from the Italian commedia dell'arte. The primary members of this group are Pantalone, Il Dottore and Il Capitano. Pantalone and Il Dottore are the alter ego of each other, Pantalone being the decadent wealthy merchant, and Il Dottore being the decadent erudite.

They are overwhelmingly the antagonists, opposing the love of the innamorati; the comic ending is produced when the zanni manage to overcome them and unite the lovers.

"Vecchio" is the Italian word for "old" (as used in Ponte Vecchio, meaning "old bridge").

References

 Vecchio